The Com-Pac Sunday Cat is an American trailerable sailboat that was designed by Clark Mills, who had previously designed the Optimist.

The Sunday Cat is a development of the Com-Pac Sun Cat. The Sun Cat comes in both cabin and open day sailer models. The Sunday Cat retains the large cockpit of the day sailer, but employs a small cuddy cabin that can accommodate a portable head.

Production
The design has been built by Com-Pac Yachts in the United States starting in about 2008 and remained in production in 2019.

Design

The Sunday Cat is a recreational keelboat, built predominantly of fiberglass. It has a cat rig with a single gaff-rigged sail, a plumb stem, a nearly vertical transom, a transom-hung rudder controlled by a wooden tiller and a stub keel, with a retractable stainless steel  centerboard. It displaces  and carries  of fixed ballast.

The boat is normally fitted with a small outboard motor for docking and maneuvering. The cuddy cabin has two small portlights.

The mast, boom and gaff are designed for quick raising and lowering, while on the trailer or while afloat. All spars remain attached and lower onto a transom-mounted boom gallows. The mast has a steel hinge, secured by a pin.

See also
List of sailing boat types

Similar sailboats
Buccaneer 200
Drascombe Lugger
Drascombe Scaffie
Edel 540
Mercury 18
Mistral T-21
Naiad 18
Sandpiper 565
Sanibel 17
Siren 17

References

External links

Keelboats
2000s sailboat type designs
Sailing yachts
Trailer sailers
Sailboat type designs by Clark Mills
Sailboat types built by Com-Pac Yachts